Charles Carr (1672 - 1739) was an Irish Anglican clergyman: he was Bishop of Killaloe from 1716 to 1739.

He was born in Donore, County Kildare and educated at Trinity College, Dublin. The Chaplain of The King's Hospital, he became Vicar of Kilkea in 1701.  He was also Chaplain of the Irish House of Commons. He was consecrated Bishop of Killaloe in June 1716. He died in Dublin on 26 December 1739 and was buried at St Patrick's Cathedral in that city.

References

1682 births
1739 deaths
Alumni of Trinity College Dublin
18th-century Anglican bishops in Ireland
Anglican bishops of Killaloe
Chaplains of the Irish House of Commons